Harbour Centre, Harbour Center, Harbor Center or Harbor Centre and similar may refer to:

 Harbour Centre, a building in Vancouver, British Columbia, Canada
 Harbor Gateway Transit Center, train and bus station in Harbor Gateway, Los Angeles, California, USA, near the City of Gardena
 Harbor City Recreation Center, in Harbor City, California, USA, see Harbor City, Los Angeles
 HarborCenter, a hockey-themed mixed-use development in Buffalo, New York
 Harbor–UCLA Medical Center, a hospital in Torrance, California, USA (Los Angeles metropolitan area)
  (海港中心), a skyscraper in Wan Chai, Hong Kong
 Harbour Place Shopping Centre, shopping mall in Mulligar, Ireland
 Harbour Centre Development, hotel and restaurant company in Hong Kong

See also 

 Centre Harbor Village Historic District, in Center Harbor, New Hampshire, USA
 Center Harbor, New Hampshire, USA
 Harbour Town
 Harbour City (disambiguation)